Geiersberg is a municipality in the district of Ried im Innkreis in the Austrian state of Upper Austria.

Population

References

Cities and towns in Ried im Innkreis District